Thomas Köhnlein (born 30 July 1972 in Karlsruhe) is a German darts player currently playing in Professional Darts Corporation events.

Köhnlein first qualified for a PDC European Tour in 2019, when he qualified for the 2019 German Darts Open, where he is due to play Dimitri Van den Bergh in the first round.

References

External links

Living people
German darts players
Professional Darts Corporation associate players
1972 births
Sportspeople from Karlsruhe